Mauroux may refer to the following places in France:

 Mauroux, Gers, a commune in the Gers department
 Mauroux, Lot, a commune in the Lot department